Kalem Island (literally "Pen Island") is an Aegean island of Turkey. It is a narrow island where the maximum length in the north to south direction is about 

The island and  Garip Island to the west were known as Arginusae islands (Greek: Ἀργινούσαι Arginóusai) in antiquity. The naval battle of Arginusae was fought around Kalem island in 406 B.C.

Presently the island is a private property. There is a hotel and a beach for the tourists and the divers.

References

Aegean islands
Islands of Turkey
Islands of İzmir Province
Dikili District